Virginia De Martin Topranin (born 20 August 1987) is an Italian cross-country skier. She competed at the FIS Nordic World Ski Championships 2013 in Val di Fiemme. She competed at the 2014 Winter Olympics in Sochi, in 15 kilometre skiathlon, and was part of the Italian team that placed eighth in the relay.

Cross-country skiing results
All results are sourced from the International Ski Federation (FIS).

Olympic games

World championships

World Cup

Team podiums
 1 podium

References

External links
 

1987 births
Living people
Cross-country skiers at the 2014 Winter Olympics
Italian female cross-country skiers
Tour de Ski skiers
Olympic cross-country skiers of Italy
Universiade medalists in cross-country skiing
Universiade bronze medalists for Italy
Competitors at the 2011 Winter Universiade